Dinesh Khanna is an Indian theatre director and acting teacher at the National School of Drama. He known for his productions based on The Boring Story written by Anton Chekhov, Dedh Inch Oopar, Zindagi Yahan, Subah ki Sair,  aur Wahan by Nirmal Verma, and Rasapriya by Phanishwarnath Renu.

Early life 
He was born in Uttar Pradesh into a Hindu family. He earned a scholarship to study at National School of Drama in New Delhi in 1986. where he obtained his Diploma specializing in Acting.

Books 

 Abhinay Chintan
 Kuchh Aansu Kuchh Phool : Jai Shankar ‘Sudnari

Major directions

References 

Living people
Indian male stage actors
21st-century Indian male actors
Indian drama teachers
National School of Drama alumni
1954 births